SM Nasarudin SM Nasimuddin (born 9 September 1983) is a Malaysian entrepreneur and businessman. He holds the position of co-chairman of the Naza Group and also the former President of the Paralympic Council of Malaysia.

Career 
After graduating in business economics from University of Southern California in the United States, he joined Naza Kia Sdn Bhd as a management trainee in 2005.

In 2006, he was appointed head of operations of Naza Corporation Sdn Bhd and took over as CEO of three Naza companies that year – Nasim Sdn Bhd (Peugeot franchise), Naza Corporation Sdn Bhd, and NZ Diners Sdn Bhd (food business, Bubba Gump Shrimp).

He was appointed chairman and CEO of Naza effective 16 May 2008 to replace his father, SM Nasimuddin SM Amin who died on 1 May 2008. This appointment was made to fulfill SM Nasimuddin's wishes.

He also held the position of President of the Paralympic Council of Malaysia from 2016 to 2019.

Personal life 
SM Nasarudin was born and raised in Kuala Pilah, Negeri Sembilan. On December 17, 2010, he married TV personality, Marion Caunter. Nasarudin and Marion have three children.

References 

1983 births
People from Negeri Sembilan
Malaysian people of Malay descent
Malaysian Muslims
Malaysian people of Minangkabau descent
21st-century Malaysian businesspeople
Living people
University of Southern California alumni